Tank badge may refer to:

 Tank Destruction Badge, WWII Nazi decoration for single-handedly destroying an enemy armoured vehicle
 Panzer Badge, WWII Nazi decoration for participation in an armoured assault
 Luftwaffe Panzer Badge, WWII Nazi decoration for Luftwaffe personnel who participated in armoured assaults
 Condor Legion Tank Badge, German decoration for Condor Legion tank crews in the Spanish Civil War
 Tank Memorial Badge, Weimar Republic decoration for WWI armour crews